Dr. Alvin T. Onaka is the Registrar of Vital Statistics for the State of Hawaii. Onaka was the 2008 recipient of the Halbert L. Dunn Award, an award presented by the National Association for Public Health Statistics and Information Systems (NAPHSIS). He was elected President of NAPHSIS in 2002.

Onaka gained national attention as the person who, along with Hawaii Health Director Dr. Chiyome Fukino, verified Barack Obama's original birth records in Hawaii, and as the one who certified the birth certificate released by the Obama campaign in 2008 and the 2011 certificate released by the White House.

References

People from Hawaii
Living people
Year of birth missing (living people)